Confienza was the last of four  torpedo cruisers built for the Italian Regia Marina (Royal Navy) in the 1880s. The ship was built in the late 1880s, with her keel laying in September 1887 at the Arsenale di La Spezia; she was completed in April 1890 and thereafter entered service with the Italian fleet. Confienza had a short and uneventful career; she spent her time in Italian waters and did not see any action. Stricken from the naval register in August 1901, she was thereafter broken up for scrap.

Design

She displaced  normally. Her propulsion system consisted of two  double-expansion steam engines each driving a single screw propeller, with steam supplied by four coal-fired locomotive boilers. She had a crew of between 105 and 121.

The primary armament for Confienza was five  torpedo tubes. She carried a heavier gun armament than her sisters, and was the only vessel of the class to carry a medium-caliber weapon, a single  32-caliber (cal.) gun mounted on the bow. She also carried a light gun battery for defense against torpedo boats. This consisted of six  40-cal. guns and two  20-cal. guns, all mounted singly.

Service history
The keel for Confienza was laid down at the Arsenale di La Spezia in September 1887, the last member of her class to begin construction. She was launched on 28 July 1889, and fitting-out work was completed on 11 April 1890. She then began her sea trials, which concluded in June. She remained there through 1894. Later in 1894, the ship was assigned to the Third Division of the Italian fleet, along with the ironclad  and the newly commissioned protected cruiser . The following year, Confienza was stationed in the 2nd Maritime Department, split between Taranto and  Naples, along with most of the torpedo cruisers in the Italian fleet.

Confienzas career was the shortest of the members of her class, having spent just over a decade in service before she was stricken from the naval register on 26 August 1901 and broken up for scrap.

Notes

References

External links
 Confienza Marina Militare website 

Goito-class cruisers
1889 ships
Ships built in La Spezia